Patrick Gillespie may refer to:
 Patrick Gillespie (minister)
 Patrick Gillespie (baseball)
 Patrick B. Gillespie, member of the Pennsylvania House of Representatives